Sylvester Stamps (born February 24, 1961 in Vicksburg, Mississippi) is a former professional American football running back/wide receiver in the National Football League. He played six seasons for the Atlanta Falcons (1984–1988) and the Tampa Bay Buccaneers (1989).

References

1961 births
Living people
Sportspeople from Vicksburg, Mississippi
Players of American football from Mississippi
American football running backs
American football wide receivers
Atlanta Falcons players
Tampa Bay Buccaneers players
Jackson State Tigers football players